DATADVANCE  Is a software development company, evolved out of a collaborative research program between Airbus and Institute for Information Transmission Problems  of  the Russian Academy of Sciences (IITP RAS).

Product

pSeven Core, embedded in company main product pSeven, provides unique proprietary and state-of-the-art algorithms for dimension reduction, design of experiments, sensitivity analysis, meta-modeling, uncertainty quantification as well as modern single, multi-objective and robust optimization strategies.

References

External links 
 

Computer system optimization software
Mathematical optimization software
Optimization algorithms and methods